David Foulis may refer to:

Sir David Foulis, 1st Baronet (died 1642), Scottish politician
Sir David Foulis, 3rd Baronet (1633–1695), MP for Northallerton (UK Parliament constituency)
David Foulis (golfer) (1868–1950), born in Scotland
David J. Foulis (1930–2018), American mathematician